The Peter Johansen House is a historic house in Castle Dale, Utah. It was built with bricks from Provo in 1912 for Peter Johansen II, the son of Danish immigrants who converted to the Church of Jesus Christ of Latter-day Saints. Johansen was a cattle rancher, and he enlisted family members to build the house, which was designed in the Late Victorian style. He lived here with his first wife, née Zora Elizabeth Cook. After she died, he married Sophia Monsen Poulsen. Johansen had three sons and two daughters; he died in 1936. The house has been listed on the National Register of Historic Places since March 19, 1980.

References

National Register of Historic Places in Emery County, Utah
Victorian architecture in Utah
Houses completed in 1912
1912 establishments in Utah